"Love" is a song from Walt Disney's film Robin Hood with the lyrics and music by Floyd Huddleston and George Bruns. The lyrics were sung by Huddleston's wife, Nancy Adams instead of Monica Evans, who voiced Maid Marian for the rest of the film.

The song was nominated for the Academy Award for Best Original Song that a young Jodie Foster and Johnny Whitaker performed a singing duet together of their version on stage at the 46th Academy Awards, but lost to "The Way We Were" from the film of the same name.

The song was also used in the soundtrack for the 2009 film Fantastic Mr. Fox, directed by Wes Anderson, as well as on the 2023 Amazon.com Super Bowl ad "Saving Sawyer".

References

1973 songs
Disney songs
Depictions of Robin Hood in music
Songs written by Floyd Huddleston
Songs with music by George Bruns
Love themes
Walt Disney Records singles